Kong is an inverted roller coaster located at Six Flags Discovery Kingdom amusement park in Vallejo, California. The Suspended Looping Coaster (SLC) model was manufactured by Vekoma and first opened to the public as Hangman at Opryland USA on May 1, 1995. Following Opryland's closure in 1997, the roller coaster was sold to Premier Parks and moved to Six Flags Discovery Kingdom, where it reopened as Kong in May 1998.

History

Opryland USA
Kong was previously located at the now-defunct Opryland USA theme park in Nashville, Tennessee where it was known as The Hangman. The ride was officially announced on October 8, 1994. Opened on May 1, 1995, it was notably the last major attraction to be added to Opryland before the park closed at the end of the 1997 season.

The Hangman was located in the American West area of the park, in an area formerly occupied by the Tin Lizzies antique car ride. Upon Opryland's closure, The Hangman was disassembled and sold to Premier Parks. Soon afterwards, it was relocated and rebuilt at Six Flags Discovery Kingdom as Kong after Premier Parks acquired the Six Flags chain.

Six Flags Discovery Kingdom
Kong debuted as the first coaster at The New Marine World Theme Park 
(later Six Flags Discovery Kingdom) on Memorial Day Weekend of 1998. Today, The Flash: Vertical Velocity and Medusa, hold the height and speed records in Discovery Kingdom and Northern California.

Kong's entrance was previously loaded near the iWerks theater (Also known as the "Dino Sphere"). In 2007, the park moved the attraction's entrance to Oasis Plaza. Guests now walk under the ride to get to the loading platform.

During Fright Fest 2016, Kong was given a virtual reality (VR) upgrade. The experience would be called Rage of the Gargoyles. Riders had the option to wear Samsung Gear VR headsets, powered by Oculus to create a 360-degree, 3D experience while riding. The illusion was themed to a fighter jet, where riders flew through a futuristic city as co-pilots battling demonic creatures. On February 8, 2017, Six Flags announced that Kong would offer a new VR experience known as The New Revolution Galactic Attack. It was billed as the world's first mixed Virtual Reality Experience powered by Oculus VR. The experience was centered around an alien invasion in space.

Ride experience
Kong starts with a  lift hill. Followed by that is a  drop, a rollover, sidewinder, turn and back to back inline twists, before slamming to a stop, or trimming into the brakes.

References

External links
The Hangman at RCDB
Six Flags webpage

Roller coasters operated by Six Flags
Roller coasters introduced in 1998
Six Flags Discovery Kingdom